Orthocomotis benedeki is a species of moth of the family Tortricidae. It is found in Peru.

The wingspan is 30 mm. The ground colour of the forewings is white with greenish sparsely black scaled suffusions. The markings are black. The hindwings are brownish grey with whitish shades.

Etymology
The species is named for its collector Dr. B. Benedek.

References

Moths described in 2013
Orthocomotis